Yoshikane is a masculine Japanese given name.

Possible writings
Yoshikane can be written using different combinations of kanji characters. Here are some examples:

義金, "justice, gold"
義兼, "justice, simultaneous"
義鐘, "justice, bell"
吉金, "good luck, gold"
吉兼, "good luck, simultaneous"
吉鐘, "good luck, bell"
善金, "virtuous, gold"
善兼, "virtuous, simultaneous"
善鐘, "virtuous, bell"
芳金, "virtuous/fragrant, gold"
芳兼, "virtuous/fragrant, simultaneous"
芳鐘, "virtuous/fragrant, abell"
良金, "good, gold"
良兼, "good, simultaneous"
良鐘, "good, bell"
芳兼, "virtuous/fragrant, simultaneous"
喜金, "rejoice, gold"
慶兼, "congratulate, simultaneous"

The name can also be written in hiragana よしかね or katakana ヨシカネ.

Notable people with the name
, Japanese samurai
, Japanese noble
, Japanese astronomer
Yoshikane Nakajima (中島 吉謙, born 1978), Japanese boxer

Japanese masculine given names